Megachile melanopyga is a species of bee in the family Megachilidae. It is found in Europe.

References

melanopyga
Insects described in 1863